Donalda Meiželytė (born 7 August 1975) is a Lithuanian politician and former television presenter who served in the Tenth Seimas of Lithuania from 2008 to 2012 for the Christian Party (Lithuania).

Career 
Meiželytė was a member of the Jury in the first quarterfinal of the pre-selection process in the Eurovision Song Contest 2007. She joined the Seimas in 2008.

References

External links 
 Personal Blog (Blogspot.com)

Living people
People from Šilutė
21st-century Lithuanian women politicians
21st-century Lithuanian politicians
Lithuanian television presenters
Lithuanian women television presenters
Lithuanian journalists
Lithuanian women journalists
Lithuanian Christians
Women members of the Seimas
Members of the Seimas
1975 births